Two Kinds of Love may refer to:

 Amores ("The Two Kinds of Love"), work by Lucian
 Two Kinds of Love (film), 1920 film directed by B. Reeves Eason
 Two Kinds of Love, 1983 TV-film directed by Jack Bender
 A 1955 single by Eddy Arnold
 A 1989 single by Stevie Nicks